The 1996–97 season was Colchester United's 55th season in their history and their fifth consecutive season in the fourth tier of English football, the Third Division. Alongside competing in the Third Division, the club also participated in the FA Cup, the League Cup and the Football League Trophy.

Following the play-off disappointment of last season, the U's looked to earn a play-off spot at the very least, but missed out by just one point, finishing in eighth.

Colchester reached the 1997 Football League Trophy Final, reaching Wembley for only the second time where they faced Carlisle United. The score remained 0–0 after extra time but Colchester were defeated 4–3 in a penalty shoot-out.

In the FA Cup, Colchester were eliminated by old foes Wycombe Wanderers in the first round, while Huddersfield Town defeated the U's at the second round stage.

Season overview
Layer Road's Clock End received a makeover during the off season, with a new covered and all seated stand in place.

In the League Cup, Colchester overturned a 3–2 first leg deficit against West Bromwich Albion into victory with a 3–1 win at The Hawthorns with Steve Whitton in goal for the entire second half following an injury to goalkeeper Garrett Caldwell. They were then defeated in the second round by Huddersfield Town.

Colchester made a first round FA Cup exit following defeat by old rivals Wycombe Wanderers.

In September, Mark Kinsella made a move to Charlton Athletic for £150,000.

Paul Buckle scored Colchester's first-ever golden goal in the Football League Trophy against Millwall following a first round win against Cambridge United. In the area quarter-final, the U's dispatched Brentford and then Northampton Town in the semi-final. Colchester then overturned a 2–0 deficit from the first leg of the area final with Peterborough United to win 3–0 after extra time to set up a Wembley final with Carlisle United.

In the final with 45,077 in attendance, neither side could find a breakthrough, and the tie went to extra time following a goalless 90 minutes. Another goalless 30 minutes followed and the match went to a penalty shoot-out. The U's took the lead in the shoot-out after Owen Archdeacon missed Carlisle's second effort, but consecutive misses from youth team product Karl Duguid and Peter Cawley meant that Steve Hayward's converted effort won the shoot-out for Carlisle 4–3.

In the league, six defeats in eight league matches saw Colchester slip to 13th in the table. Manager Steve Wignall said:

Colchester ended the season in 8th position, one point shy of the play-off positions.

Players

Transfers

In

 Total spending:  ~ £106,000

Out

 Total incoming:  ~ £165,000

Loans in

Loans out

Match details

Third Division

Results round by round

League table

Matches

League Cup

FA Cup

Football League Trophy

Squad statistics

Appearances and goals

|-
!colspan="14"|Players who appeared for Colchester who left during the season

|}

Goalscorers

Disciplinary record

Clean sheets
Number of games goalkeepers kept a clean sheet.

Player debuts
Players making their first-team Colchester United debut in a fully competitive match.

See also
List of Colchester United F.C. seasons

References

General
Books

Websites

Specific

1996-97
English football clubs 1996–97 season
1996–97 Football League Third Division by team